

Events

Pre-1600
164 BCE – Judas Maccabeus, son of Mattathias of the Hasmonean family, rededicates the Temple in Jerusalem, an event is commemorated each year by the festival of Hanukkah. (25 Kislev 3597 in the Hebrew calendar.)
 235 – Pope Anterus succeeds Pontian as the nineteenth pope.
1386 – Timur of Samarkand captures and sacks the Georgian capital of Tbilisi, taking King Bagrat V of Georgia captive.

1601–1900
1620 – Plymouth Colony settlers sign the Mayflower Compact (November 11, O.S.)
1676 – The Danish astronomer Ole Rømer presents the first quantitative measurements of the speed of light.
1783 – In Paris, Jean-François Pilâtre de Rozier and François Laurent d'Arlandes make the first untethered hot air balloon flight.
1789 – North Carolina ratifies the United States Constitution and is admitted as the 12th U.S. state.
1851 – Mutineers take control of the Chilean penal colony of Punta Arenas in the Strait of Magellan.
1861 – American Civil War: Confederate President Jefferson Davis appoints Judah Benjamin Secretary of War.
1877 – Thomas Edison announces his invention of the phonograph, a machine that can record and play sound.
1894 – Port Arthur, China, falls to the Japanese, a decisive victory of the First Sino-Japanese War; Japanese troops are accused of massacring the remaining inhabitants.
1900 – Claude Monet's paintings shown at Gallery Durand-Ruel in Paris.

1901–present
1902 – The Philadelphia Football Athletics defeat the Kanaweola Athletic Club of Elmira, New York, 39–0, in the first-ever professional American football night game.
1905 – Albert Einstein's paper that leads to the mass–energy equivalence formula, E = mc², is published in the journal Annalen der Physik. 
1916 – Mines from SM U-73 sink HMHS Britannic, the largest ship lost in the First World War.
1918 – The Flag of Estonia, previously used by pro-independence activists, is formally adopted as the national flag of the Republic of Estonia.
  1918   – The Parliament (Qualification of Women) Act 1918 is passed, allowing women to stand for Parliament in the UK.
  1918   – A pogrom takes place in Lwów (now Lviv); over three days, at least 50 Jews and 270 Ukrainian Christians are killed by Poles.
1920 – Irish War of Independence: On "Bloody Sunday" in Dublin, the Irish Republican Army (IRA) assassinated a group of British Intelligence agents, and British forces killed 14 civilians at a Gaelic football match at Croke Park.
1922 – Rebecca Latimer Felton of Georgia takes the oath of office, becoming the first female United States Senator.
1927 – Columbine Mine massacre: Striking coal miners are allegedly attacked with machine guns by a detachment of state police dressed in civilian clothes.
1942 – The completion of the Alaska Highway (also known as the Alcan Highway) is celebrated (however, the highway is not usable by standard road vehicles until 1943).
1944 – World War II: American submarine USS Sealion sinks the Japanese battleship Kongō and Japanese destroyer Urakaze in the Formosa Strait.
1945 – The United Auto Workers strike 92 General Motors plants in 50 cities to back up worker demands for a 30-percent raise.
1950 – Two Canadian National Railway trains collide in northeastern British Columbia in the Canoe River train crash; the death toll is 21, with 17 of them Canadian troops bound for Korea.
1953 – The Natural History Museum, London announces that the "Piltdown Man" skull, initially believed to be one of the most important fossilized hominid skulls ever found, is a hoax.
1959 – American disc jockey Alan Freed, who had popularized the term "rock and roll" and music of that style, is fired from WABC radio over allegations he had participated in the payola scandal.
1961 – The "La Ronde" opens in Honolulu, first revolving restaurant in the United States.
1962 – The Chinese People's Liberation Army declares a unilateral ceasefire in the Sino-Indian War.
1964 – The Verrazano-Narrows Bridge opens to traffic. At the time it is the world's longest bridge span.
  1964   – Second Vatican Council: The third session of the Roman Catholic Church's ecumenical council closes.
1967 – Vietnam War: American General William Westmoreland tells news reporters: "I am absolutely certain that whereas in 1965 the enemy was winning, today he is certainly losing."
1969 – U.S. President Richard Nixon and Japanese Premier Eisaku Satō agree on the return of Okinawa to Japanese control in 1972. The U.S. retains rights to bases on the island, but these are to be nuclear-free.
  1969   – The first permanent ARPANET link is established between UCLA and SRI.
1970 – Vietnam War: Operation Ivory Coast: A joint United States Air Force and Army team raids the Sơn Tây prisoner-of-war camp in an attempt to free American prisoners of war thought to be held there.
1971 – Indian troops, partly aided by Mukti Bahini (Bengali guerrillas), defeat the Pakistan army in the Battle of Garibpur.
1972 – Voters in South Korea overwhelmingly approve a new constitution, giving legitimacy to Park Chung-hee and the Fourth Republic.
1974 – The Birmingham pub bombings kill 21 people. The Birmingham Six are sentenced to life in prison for the crime but subsequently acquitted.
1977 – Minister of Internal Affairs Allan Highet announces that the national anthems of New Zealand shall be the traditional anthem "God Save the Queen" and "God Defend New Zealand".
1979 – The United States Embassy in Islamabad, Pakistan, is attacked by a mob and set on fire, killing four.
1980 – A deadly fire breaks out at the MGM Grand Hotel in Paradise, Nevada (now Bally's Las Vegas). Eighty-five people are killed and more than 650 are injured in the worst disaster in Nevada history.
1985 – United States Navy intelligence analyst Jonathan Pollard is arrested for spying after being caught giving Israel classified information on Arab nations. He is subsequently sentenced to life in prison.
1986 – National Security Council member Oliver North and his secretary start to shred documents allegedly implicating them in the Iran–Contra affair.
1990 – Bangkok Airways Flight 125 crashes on approach to Samui Airport, killing 38.
1992 – A major tornado strikes the Houston, Texas area during the afternoon. Over the next two days the largest tornado outbreak ever to occur in the US during November spawns over 100 tornadoes. 
1995 – The Dayton Agreement is initialed at the Wright-Patterson Air Force Base, near Dayton, Ohio, ending three and a half years of war in Bosnia and Herzegovina.
1996 – Humberto Vidal explosion: Thirty-three people die when a Humberto Vidal shoe shop in Río Piedras, Puerto Rico explodes.
1998 – Finnish satanist Jarno Elg kills a 23-year-old man and performs a ritual-like cutting and eating of body parts in Hyvinkää, Finland.
2002 – NATO invites Bulgaria, Estonia, Latvia, Lithuania, Romania, Slovakia and Slovenia to become members.
  2002   – Arturo Guzmán Decena, founder of Los Zetas and high-member of the Gulf Cartel, is killed in a shoot-out with the Mexican Army and the police.
2004 – The second round of the Ukrainian presidential election is held, giving rise to massive protests and controversy over the election's integrity.
  2004   – Dominica is hit by the most destructive earthquake in its history. The northern half of the island sustains the most damage, especially the town of Portsmouth. In neighboring Guadeloupe, one person is killed.
  2004   – The Paris Club agrees to write off 80% (up to $100 billion) of Iraq's external debt.
2006 – Anti-Syrian Lebanese politician and government minister Pierre Gemayel is assassinated in suburban Beirut.
2009 – A mine explosion in Heilongjiang, China kills 108.
2012 – At least 28 are wounded after a bomb is thrown onto a bus in Tel Aviv.
2013 – Fifty-four people are killed when the roof of a shopping center collapses in Riga, Latvia. 
  2013   – Massive protests start in Ukraine after President Viktor Yanukovych suspended signing the Ukraine–European Union Association Agreement.
2014 – A stampede in Kwekwe, Zimbabwe caused by the police firing tear gas kills at least eleven people and injures 40 others. 
2015 – The government of Belgium imposes a security lockdown on Brussels, including the closure of shops, schools, and public transportation, due to potential terrorist attacks.
2017 – Robert Mugabe formally resigns as President of Zimbabwe, after thirty-seven years in office.
2019 – Israeli Prime Minister Benjamin Netanyahu is indicted on charges of bribery, fraud, and breach of trust.
  2019   – Tesla launches the SUV Cybertruck. A gaffe occurs during the launch event when its "unbreakable" windows shatter during demonstration.
2021 – An SUV plows through a Christmas parade in Waukesha, Wisconsin, killing six and injuring 62.

Births

Pre-1600
1495 – John Bale, English bishop and historian (d. 1563)
1567 – Anne de Xainctonge, French saint, founded the Society of the Sisters of Saint Ursula of the Blessed Virgin (d. 1621)

1601–1900
1631 – Catharina Questiers, Dutch poet (d. 1669)
1692 – Carlo Innocenzo Frugoni, Italian poet and academic (d. 1768)
1694 – Voltaire, French writer and philosopher (d. 1778)
1718 – Friedrich Wilhelm Marpurg, German composer, critic, and theorist (d. 1795)
1729 – Josiah Bartlett, American physician and politician, 6th Governor of New Hampshire (d. 1795)
1760 – Joseph Plumb Martin, American sergeant (d. 1850)
1768 – Friedrich Schleiermacher, German theologian, philosopher, and scholar (d. 1834)
1785 – William Beaumont, American surgeon, "Father of Gastric Physiology" (d. 1853)
1787 – Samuel Cunard, Canadian businessman, founded the Cunard Line (d. 1865)
1811 – Ludwik Gorzkowski, Polish politician, physicist, and revolutionary activist (d. 1857)
1818 – Lewis H. Morgan, American lawyer, anthropologist, and theorist (d. 1881)
1834 – Hetty Green, American businesswoman and financier (d. 1916)
1840 – Victoria, Princess Royal of England (d. 1901)
1851 – Désiré-Joseph Mercier, Belgian cardinal and theologian (d. 1926)
1852 – Francisco Tárrega, Spanish guitarist and composer (d. 1909)
1853 – Hussein Kamel of Egypt (d. 1917)
1854 – Pope Benedict XV (d. 1922)
1866 – Sigbjørn Obstfelder, Norwegian poet and author (d. 1900)
  1866   – Konishiki Yasokichi I, Japanese sumo wrestler, the 17th Yokozuna (d. 1914)
1870 – Alexander Berkman, Lithuanian-American activist and author (d. 1936)
  1870   – Joe Darling, Australian cricketer and politician (d. 1946)
  1870   – Stanley Jackson, English cricketer and politician (d. 1947)
1876 – Olav Duun, Norwegian author and educator (d. 1939)
1877 – Sigfrid Karg-Elert, German composer and educator (d. 1933)
1878 – Gustav Radbruch, German lawyer and politician, German Minister of Justice (d. 1949)
1886 – Harold Nicolson, English author and politician (d. 1968)
1894 – Cecil M. Harden, American politician (d. 1984)
1897 – Mollie Steimer, Russian-American activist (d. 1980)
1898 – René Magritte, Belgian painter (d. 1967)
1899 – Jobyna Ralston, American actress (d. 1967)
  1899   – Harekrushna Mahatab, Indian journalist and politician, 1st Chief Minister of Odisha (d. 1987)

1901–present
1902 – Foster Hewitt, Canadian sportscaster (d. 1985)
  1902   – Mikhail Suslov, Russian soldier, economist, and politician (d. 1982)
1903 – Isaac Bashevis Singer, Polish-American novelist and short story writer, Nobel Prize laureate (d. 1991)
1904 – Coleman Hawkins, American saxophonist and clarinet player (d. 1969)
1905 – Georgina Battiscombe, British biographer (d. 2006)
1907 – Buck Ram, American songwriter and music producer (d. 1991)
1908 – Leo Politi, Italian-American author and illustrator (d. 1996)
  1908   – Elizabeth George Speare, American author and educator (d. 1994)
1912 – Eleanor Powell, American actress and dancer (d. 1982)
1913 – John Boulting, English director, producer, and screenwriter (d. 1985)
  1913   – Roy Boulting, English director, producer, and screenwriter (d. 2001)
  1913   – Gunnar Kangro, Estonian mathematician, author, and academic (d. 1975)
1914 – Nusret Fişek, Turkish physician and politician, Turkish Minister of Health (d. 1990)
  1914   – Henri Laborit, French physician and philosopher (d. 1995)
1915 – Norm Smith, Australian footballer and coach (d. 1973)
1916 – Sid Luckman, American football player and soldier (d. 1998)
1917 – Chung Il-kwon, Korean politician, diplomat, and soldier (d.1994)
1919 – Paul Bogart, American director and producer (d. 2012)
1920 – Ralph Meeker, American actor (d. 1988)
  1920   – Stan Musial, American baseball player and manager (d. 2013)
1921 – Donald Sheldon, American pilot (d. 1975)
1922 – Abe Lemons, American basketball player and coach (d. 2002)
1924 – Joseph Campanella, American actor (d. 2018)
  1924   – Milka Planinc, Yugoslav politician, 28th Prime Minister of Yugoslavia (d. 2010)
  1924   – Christopher Tolkien, English author and academic (d. 2020)
1925 – Veljko Kadijević, Croatian general and politician, 5th Federal Secretary of People's Defence (d. 2014)
1926 – William Wakefield Baum, American cardinal (d. 2015)
  1926   – Matti Ranin, Finnish actor (d. 2013)
1927 – Georgia Frontiere, American businesswoman (d. 2008)
1929 – Marilyn French, American author and academic (d. 2009)
  1929   – Laurier LaPierre, Canadian historian, journalist, and politician (d. 2012)
1930 – Marjan Rožanc, Slovenian journalist, author, and playwright (d. 1990)
1931 – Lewis Binford, American archaeologist and academic (d. 2011)
  1931   – Revaz Dogonadze, Georgian chemist and physicist (d. 1985)
  1931   – Stanley Kalms, Baron Kalms, English businessman
  1931   – Malcolm Williamson, Australian pianist and composer (d. 2003)
1932 – Beryl Bainbridge, English author and screenwriter (d. 2010)
  1932   – Pelle Gudmundsen-Holmgreen, Danish composer (d. 2016)
1933 – Henry Hartsfield, American colonel, pilot, and astronaut (d. 2014)
  1933   – Etta Zuber Falconer, American educator and mathematician (d. 2002)
  1933   – Jean Shepard, American country music singer-songwriter (d. 2016)
1934 – Laurence Luckinbill, American actor, director, and playwright
  1934   – Peter Philpott, Australian cricketer (d. 2021)
1936 – Victor Chang, Chinese-Australian surgeon (d. 1991)
1937 – Ingrid Pitt, Polish-English actress (d. 2010)
  1937   – Marlo Thomas, American actress, producer, and activist
1939 – R. Budd Dwyer, American educator and politician, 30th Treasurer of Pennsylvania (d. 1987)
1940 – Freddy Beras-Goico, Dominican comedian and television host (d. 2010)
  1940   – Richard Marcinko, American commander and author
  1940   – Natalia Makarova, Russian ballerina, choreographer, and actress
1941 – Juliet Mills, English-American actress
  1941   – David Porter, American songwriter, musician, and producer
1942 – Heidemarie Wieczorek-Zeul, German educator and politician
1943 – Phil Bredesen, American businessman and politician, 48th Governor of Tennessee
  1943   – Jacques Laffite, French race car driver
1944 – Dick Durbin, American lawyer and politician
  1944   – Earl Monroe, American basketball player
  1944   – Harold Ramis, American actor, director, producer, and screenwriter (d. 2014)
1945 – Goldie Hawn, American actress, singer, and producer
1948 – Michel Suleiman, Lebanese general and politician, 16th President of Lebanon
  1948   – George Zimmer, American businessman, founded Men's Wearhouse
  1948   – Lonnie Jordan,  American singer-songwriter
  1948   – Alphonse Mouzon, American jazz drummer (d. 2016)
1950 – Gary Pihl, American guitarist Boston
  1950   – Hisham Barakat, Egyptian lawyer and judge (d. 2015)
  1950   – Livingston Taylor, American singer-songwriter and musician 
1952 – Mervyn Davies, Baron Davies of Abersoch, Welsh banker and politician
  1952   – Janne Kristiansen, Norwegian lawyer and jurist
  1952   – Lorna Luft, American actress and singer
1953 – Tina Brown, English-American journalist and author
1954 – Fiona Pitt-Kethley, English journalist, author, and poet
1955 – Peter Koppes, Australian singer-songwriter and guitarist
  1955   – Cedric Maxwell, American basketball player, coach, and sportscaster
  1955   – Glenn Ridge, Australian radio and television host and producer
1956 – Cherry Jones, American actress
1959 – Sergei Ratnikov, Estonian footballer and manager
1960 – Mark Bailey, English rugby player, author, and educator
  1960   – Brian McNamara, American actor, director, and producer
  1960   – Brian Ritchie, American bass player and songwriter 
1961 – João Domingos Pinto, Portuguese footballer and manager
1962 – Steven Curtis Chapman, American Christian music singer-songwriter, musician, record producer, actor, author, and social activist
  1962   – Alan Smith, English football player
1963 – Dave Molyneux, Manx motorcycle racer
  1963   – Nicollette Sheridan, English actress
1964 – Shane Douglas, American wrestler and manager
  1964   – Liza Tarbuck, English actress, television & radio presenter
  1964   – Charles Dunstone, English businessman, co-founded Carphone Warehouse
  1964   – Olden Polynice, Haitian-American basketball player and coach
  1964   – Stefan Sonnenfeld, American businessman, co-founded Company 3
1965 – Björk, Icelandic singer-songwriter
  1965   – Reggie Lewis, American basketball player (d. 1993)
1966 – Troy Aikman, American football player and sportscaster
  1966   – Evgeny Bareev, Russian chess player and coach
  1966   – Thanasis Kolitsidakis, Greek footballer
1967 – Ken Block, American race car driver (d. 2023)
  1967   – Tripp Cromer, American baseball player
  1967   – Toshihiko Koga, Japanese martial artist
  1967   – Amanda Lepore, American model and singer
1968 – Andrew Caddick, New Zealand-English cricketer
  1968   – Alex James, English singer-songwriter, bass player
  1968   – Antonio Tarver, American boxer, sportscaster, and actor
1969 – Ken Griffey Jr., American baseball player and actor
1970 – Karen Davila, Filipino journalist
  1970   – Justin Langer, Australian cricketer and coach
1971 – Michael Strahan, American football player, actor, and talk show host
1972 – Rich Johnston, English author and critic
  1972   – Rain Phoenix, American actress and singer 
1972 – Darrell Cavens, Canadian co-founder and former CEO of e-commerce company Zulily
1976 – Mihaela Botezan, Romanian long-distance runner
  1976   – Saleem Elahi, Pakistani cricketer
  1976   – Martin Meichelbeck, German footballer
  1976   – Daniel Whiston, English figure skater
  1976   – Michael Wilson, Australian footballer
1977 – Michael Batiste, American former professional basketball player
  1977   – Yolande James, Canadian lawyer and politician
  1977   – Jonas Jennings, American football player
1978 – Daniel Bradshaw, Australian footballer
  1978   – Lucía Jiménez, Spanish actress and singer
1979 – Vincenzo Iaquinta, Italian footballer
  1979   – Stromile Swift, American basketball player
  1979   – Alex Tanguay, Canadian ice hockey player
1980 – Hank Blalock, American baseball player
  1980   – Alec Brownstein, American author and director
  1980   – Leonardo González, Costa Rican footballer
1981 – Wesley Britt, American football player
  1981   – Ainārs Kovals, Latvian javelin thrower
  1981   – Jonny Magallón, Mexican footballer
1982 – Ioana Ciolacu, Romanian fashion designer
  1982   – Georgios Kalogiannidis, Greek archer
1984 – Álvaro Bautista, Spanish motorcycle racer
  1984   – Jena Malone, American actress and singer
1985 – Carly Rae Jepsen, Canadian singer-songwriter and actress
  1985   – Jesús Navas, Spanish footballer
  1985   – Nicola Silvestri, Italian footballer
1986 – Colleen Ballinger, American YouTuber, comedian, actress, and singer
  1986   – Ben Bishop, American ice hockey player
  1986   – Kristof Goddaert, Belgian cyclist (d. 2014)
1987 – Stefan Glarner, Swiss footballer
  1987   – Eesha Karavade, Indian chess player
1988 – Len Väljas, Canadian skier
  1988   – Preston Zimmerman, American soccer player
1989 – Will Buckley, English footballer
  1989   – Dárvin Chávez, Mexican footballer
  1989   – Justin Tucker, American football player
1990 – Dani King, English cyclist
  1990   – Georgie Twigg, English field hockey player
1991 – Almaz Ayana, Ethiopian sprinter
  1991   – Lewis Dunk, English footballer
  1991   – Peni Terepo, New Zealand rugby league player
1994 – Saúl Ñíguez, Spanish footballer
1997 – Reo Hatate, Japanese footballer
1999 – Jaelin Howell, American soccer player

Deaths

Pre-1600
 615 – Columbanus, Irish missionary and saint (b. 543)
 933 – Al-Tahawi, Arab imam and scholar (b. 853)
1011 – Reizei, emperor of Japan (b. 950)
1136 – William de Corbeil, English archbishop (b. 1070)
1150 – García Ramírez of Navarre (b. 1112)
1325 – Yury of Moscow, Prince of Moscow and Vladimir
1361 – Philip I, Duke of Burgundy (b. 1346)
1555 – Georgius Agricola, German mineralogist, philologist, and scholar (b. 1490)
1566 – Annibale Caro, Italian poet and author (b. 1507)
1579 – Thomas Gresham, English merchant and financier (b. 1519)

1601–1900
1639 – Henry Grey, 8th Earl of Kent, English politician, Lord Lieutenant of Bedfordshire (b. 1583)
1652 – Jan Brożek, Polish mathematician, physician, and astronomer (b. 1585)
1695 – Henry Purcell, English organist and composer (b. 1659)
1710 – Bernardo Pasquini, Italian organist and composer (b. 1637)
1775 – John Hill, English botanist and author (b. 1719)
1782 – Jacques de Vaucanson, French engineer (b. 1709)
1811 – Heinrich von Kleist, German poet and author (b. 1777)
1844 – Ivan Krylov, Russian poet and playwright (b. 1769)
1859 – Yoshida Shōin, Japanese academic and politician (b. 1830)
1861 – Jean-Baptiste Henri Lacordaire, French priest and activist (b. 1802)
1870 – Karel Jaromír Erben, Czech historian and poet (b. 1811)
1874 – Marià Fortuny, Spanish painter (b. 1838)
1881 – Ami Boué, German-Austrian geologist and ethnographer (b. 1794)
1899 – Garret Hobart, American lawyer and politician, 24th Vice President of the United States (b. 1844)

1901–present
1907 – Harry Boyle, Australian cricketer (b. 1847)
  1907   – Paula Modersohn-Becker, German painter (b. 1876)
1908 – Carl Friedrich Schmidt, German-Russian geologist and botanist (b. 1832)
1909 – Peder Severin Krøyer, Norwegian-Danish painter (b. 1851)
1916 – Franz Joseph I of Austria (b. 1830)
1922 – Ricardo Flores Magón, Mexican journalist and activist (b. 1874)
1926 – Edward Cummins, American golfer (b. 1886)
1928 – Heinrich XXVII, Prince Reuss Younger Line (b. 1858)
1934 – John Scaddan, Australian politician, 10th Premier of Western Australia (b. 1876)
1938 – Leopold Godowsky, Polish-American pianist and composer (b. 1870)
1941 – Henrietta Vinton Davis, American actress and playwright (b. 1860)
1942 – Count Leopold Berchtold, Austrian-Hungarian politician, Foreign Minister of Austria-Hungary (b. 1863)
  1942   – J. B. M. Hertzog, South African general and politician, 3rd Prime Minister of South Africa (b. 1866)
1943 – Winifred Carney, Irish suffragist, trade unionist, and Irish republican (b. 1887)
1945 – Robert Benchley,  American humorist, newspaper columnist, and actor (b. 1889)
  1945   – Al Davis, American boxer (b. 1920)
  1945   – Ellen Glasgow, American author (b. 1873)
  1945   – Alexander Patch, American general (b. 1889)
1947 – William McCormack, Australian politician, 22nd Premier of Queensland (b. 1879)
1953 – Felice Bonetto, Italian race car driver (b. 1903)
  1953   – António Cabreira, Portuguese polygraph (b. 1868)
  1953   – Larry Shields, American clarinet player and composer (b. 1893)
1957 – Francis Burton Harrison, American general and politician, 6th Governor-General of the Philippines (b. 1873)
1958 – Mel Ott, American baseball player, manager, and sportscaster (b. 1909)
1959 – Max Baer, American boxer, referee, and actor (b. 1909)
1962 – Frank Amyot, Canadian canoeist (b. 1904)
1963 – Artur Lemba, Estonian composer and educator (b. 1885)
  1963   – Robert Stroud, American ornithologist and author (b. 1890)
1964 – Catherine Bauer Wurster, American architect and public housing advocate (b. 1905)
1967 – C. M. Eddy, Jr., American author (b. 1896)
1970 – Newsy Lalonde, Canadian lacrosse and ice hockey player (b. 1887)
  1970   – C. V. Raman, Indian physicist and academic, Nobel Prize laureate (b. 1888)
1973 – Thomas Pelly, American lawyer and politician (b. 1902)
1974 – John B. Gambling, American radio host (b. 1897)
  1974   – Frank Martin, Swiss-Dutch pianist and composer (b. 1890)
1975 – Gunnar Gunnarsson, Icelandic author (b. 1889)
1980 – Sara García, Mexican actress (b. 1895)
1981 – Harry von Zell, American actor and comedian (b. 1906)
1982 – John Hargrave, English activist and author (b. 1894)
1984 – Ben Wilson, American basketball player (b. 1967)
1986 – Jerry Colonna, American singer-songwriter and actor (b. 1904)
1987 – Jim Folsom, American politician and 42nd Governor of Alabama (b. 1908)
1988 – Carl Hubbell, American baseball player and scout (b. 1903)
1989 – Harvey Hart, Canadian director, producer, and screenwriter (b. 1928)
  1989   – Margot Zemach, American author and illustrator (b. 1931)
1990 – Dean Hart, Canadian wrestler and referee (b. 1954)
1991 – Sonny Werblin, American businessman and philanthropist (b. 1907)
1992 – Kaysone Phomvihane, Laotian soldier and politician, 2nd President of Laos (b. 1920)
  1992   – Ricky Williams, American singer-songwriter and drummer (b. 1956)
1993 – Bill Bixby, American actor (b. 1934)
1994 – Willem Jacob Luyten, Dutch-American astronomer and academic (b. 1899)
1995 – Peter Grant, English actor and manager (b. 1935)
  1995   – Noel Jones, Indian-English diplomat, British ambassador to Kazakhstan (b. 1940)
1996 – Bernard Rose, English organist and composer (b 1916)
  1996   – Abdus Salam, Pakistani-English physicist and academic, Nobel Prize laureate (b. 1926)
1999 – Quentin Crisp, English actor, author, and illustrator (b. 1908)
2000 – Ernest Lluch, Spanish economist and politician (b. 1937)
2002 – Hadda Brooks, American singer-songwriter and pianist (b. 1916)
2005 – Alfred Anderson, Scottish soldier (b. 1896)
  2005   – Hugh Sidey, American journalist and academic (b. 1927)
2006 – Hassan Gouled Aptidon, Somalian-Djiboutian politician, 1st President of Djibouti (b. 1916)
  2006   – Pierre Amine Gemayel, Lebanese lawyer and politician (b. 1972)
2007 – Fernando Fernán Gómez, Spanish actor, director, and screenwriter (b. 1921)
  2007   – Tom Johnson, Canadian-American ice hockey player and coach (b. 1928)
  2007   – Noel McGregor, New Zealand cricketer (b. 1931)
2009 – Konstantin Feoktistov, Russian engineer and astronaut (b. 1926)
2010 – Norris Church Mailer, American author (b. 1949)
  2010   – David Nolan, American activist and politician (b. 1943)
  2010   – Margaret Taylor-Burroughs, American painter and author, co-founded the DuSable Museum of African American History (b. 1917)
2011 – Anne McCaffrey, American science fiction and fantasy author (b. 1926)
2012 – Emily Squires, American director, producer, and screenwriter (b. 1941)
  2012   – Austin Peralta, American pianist (b. 1990)
2013 – John Egerton, American journalist and author (b. 1935)
  2013   – Fred Kavli, Norwegian-American businessman and philanthropist, founded The Kavli Foundation (b. 1927)
  2013   – Dimitri Mihalas, American astronomer and author (b. 1939)
  2013   – Vern Mikkelsen, American basketball player and coach (b. 1928)
  2013   – Bernard Parmegiani, French composer (b. 1927)
  2013   – Tôn Thất Đính, Vietnamese general (b. 1926)
  2013   – Maurice Vachon, Canadian-American wrestler (b. 1929)
2014 – John H. Land, American soldier and politician (b. 1920)
  2014   – Robert Richardson, English general (b. 1929)
2015 – Gil Cardinal, Canadian director, producer, and screenwriter (b. 1950)
  2015   – Ameen Faheem, Indian-Pakistani poet and politician (b. 1939)
  2015   – Bob Foster, American boxer and police officer (b. 1938)
  2015   – Anthony Read, English screenwriter and producer (b. 1935)
  2015   – Joseph Silverstein, American violinist and conductor (b. 1932)
2016 – Hassan Sadpara, Pakistani mountaineer and adventurer (b. 1963)
2017 – David Cassidy, American singer-songwriter and guitarist (b. 1950)
2021 – Lou Cutell, American actor (b. 1930)

Holidays and observances
 Air Assault Forces Day (Ukraine)
 Armed Forces Day (Bangladesh)
 Armed Forces Day (Greece)
 Christian feast days:
 Amelberga of Susteren
 Digain
 Maurus of Parentium
 Pope Gelasius I
 Franciszka Siedliska
 Presentation of the Blessed Virgin Mary
 Rufus of Rome (no. 7 in list)
 William Byrd, John Merbecke and Thomas Tallis (Episcopal Church (USA))
 November 21 (Eastern Orthodox liturgics)
 General Framework Agreement Day (Republika Srpska)
 World Television Day (United Nations observance)

References

External links

 
 
 

Days of the year
November